The University of the West Indies Press (or UWI Press) is a university press that is part of the University of the West Indies. The first book published by the press was Slave Society in the Danish West Indies: St. Thomas, St. John and St. Croix by Neville A. T. Hall. The press is currently a member of the Association of University Presses.

References

External links
University of the West Indies Press

Press
West Indies, University of